Jack McCoy (30 November 1910 – 1 April 1976) was an Australian rules footballer who played with St Kilda in the Victorian Football League (VFL).

He later served in the Australian Army during World War II.

Notes

External links 

Jack McCoy's playing statistics from The VFA Project

1910 births
1976 deaths
Australian rules footballers from Victoria (Australia)
St Kilda Football Club players
Sandringham Football Club players